The 7th LG Cup featured:

12 players from  South Korea - An Dal-Hoon, Cho Hanseung, Cho Hunhyun, Kim Sungjun, Lee Chang-ho, Lee Sang-Hoon, Lee Sedol, Park Young-Hoon, Won Seong-jin, Yoo Changhyuk, Yun Junsang, Zhujiu Jiang
5 players from  Japan - Cho Chikun, Hane Naoki, Kobayashi Koichi, O Meien, O Rissei
4 players from  China - Chang Hao, Ma Xiaochun, Yu Bin, Zhou Heyang
1 player from  Taiwan - Zhou Junxun
1 player from  North America - Mingjiu Jiang
1 player from  Europe - Catalin Taranu

Tournament

Final

LG Cup (Go)
2003 in go